Paragraph 175 is a documentary film released in 2000, directed by Rob Epstein and Jeffrey Friedman, and narrated by Rupert Everett. The film was produced by Rob Epstein, Jeffrey Friedman, Janet Cole, Michael Ehrenzweig, Sheila Nevins and Howard Rosenman. The film chronicles the lives of several gay men and one lesbian who were persecuted by the Nazis. The gay men were arrested by the Nazis for the crime of homosexuality under Paragraph 175, the sodomy provision of the German penal code, dating back to 1871. Between 1933 and 1945, 100,000 men were arrested under Paragraph 175. Some were imprisoned, others were sent to concentration camps. Only about 4,000 survived.

In 2000, fewer than ten of these men were known to be living. Five come forward in the documentary to tell their stories for the first time, considered to be among the last untold stories of the Third Reich. 

Paragraph 175 tells of a gap in the historical record and reveals the lasting consequences, as told through personal stories of gay men and women who lived through it, including: Karl Gorath; Gad Beck, the Jewish resistance fighter who spent the war helping refugees escape Berlin; Annette Eick, a Jewish lesbian who escaped to England with the help of a woman she loved; Albrecht Becker, German Christian photographer, who was arrested and imprisoned for homosexuality, then joined the army on his release because he "wanted to be with men"; and Pierre Seel, the Alsatian teenager, who watched as his lover was eaten alive by dogs in the camps.

Awards 
 Teddy Award for best documentary film, 2000

See also 
 Persecution of homosexuals in Nazi Germany and the Holocaust

References

External links 
 
 NPR, All Things Considered - Rob Epstein remembers Pierre Seel - 2 December 2005 (audio file)

2000 films
2000 documentary films
2000 LGBT-related films
Documentary films about LGBT topics
Documentary films about the Holocaust
Films directed by Jeffrey Friedman
Films directed by Rob Epstein
Persecution of homosexuals in Nazi Germany
Sundance Film Festival award winners